Edwin H. Knopf (November 11, 1899 – December 27, 1981) was an American film producer, film director, and screenwriter.

Biography
He was born in New York City and went to work early in his life in the editorial department of his brother Alfred A. Knopf's publishing business.

After trying his hand at acting, Edwin turned to producing in 1928. Soon after being involved in several hit plays, he moved to Hollywood and found work as a director and screenwriter. Among his films as a director was Paramount on Parade (1930). As a producer, he was involved in the making of such films as B.F.'s Daughter (1948), Malaya (1949), The Law and the Lady (producer and director, 1951), Lili (1953), and The Glass Slipper (1955).

Sketches of Edwin's early life in Italy are included in the book he wrote with his wife Mildred O. Knopf, The Food of Italy and How To Prepare It (New York: Alfred A. Knopf, 1964).

Selected filmography
 Paramount on Parade (1930) - director
 The Rebel (1932) - director
The Seventh Cross (1944) - producer
The Sailor Takes a Wife (1945) - producer
The Valley of Decision (1945) - producer
The Secret Heart (1946) - producer
Cynthia (1947) - producer
B.F.'s Daughter (1948) - producer
Malaya (1949) - producer
Edward, My Son (1949) - producer
 The Law and the Lady (1951) - producer, director
Night Into Morning (1951) - producer
Mr. Imperium (1951) - producer
Fearless Fagan (1952) - producer
Lili (1953) - producer
Scandal at Scourie (1953) - producer
The Great Diamond Robbery (1954) - producer
The King's Thief (1955) - producer
The Glass Slipper (1955) - producer
Diane (1956) - producer
Gaby (1956) - producer
Tip on a Dead Jockey (1957) - producer
The Vintage (1957) - producer
Rendezvous (1960–61) - producer

References

External links

Edwin H. Knopf at TCMDB
Obituary at The New York Times

Jewish American screenwriters
1899 births
1981 deaths
Film producers from New York (state)
American male screenwriters
Writers from New York City
Film directors from New York City
American people of Polish-Jewish descent
Screenwriters from New York (state)
20th-century American male writers
20th-century American screenwriters
Knopf family
20th-century American Jews